Daniel Boone Thru the Wilderness is a 1926 American silent  historical Western film directed by Robert N. Bradbury and starring Roy Stewart, Kathleen Collins and Edward Hearn.

Cast
 Roy Stewart as Daniel Boone
 Kathleen Collins as Rebe Bryan
 Edward Hearn as The Stranger
 Jay Morley as Simon Gerty
 Frank Rice as Hank Vaughan
 Thomas G. Lingham as Otis Bryan 
 Jim O'Neill as Chief Grey Eagle 
 Emily Gerdes as Mrs. Bryan 
 Bob Steele as Jim Bryan

References

Bibliography
 Bertil O. Österberg. Colonial America on Film and Television: A Filmography. McFarland, 2000.

External links
 

1926 films
1920s historical films
1926 Western (genre) films
1920s English-language films
American historical films
American black-and-white films
Films directed by Robert N. Bradbury
Silent American Western (genre) films
1920s American films